The 2023 season was Beijing Guoan F.C.'s 59th season in football competition and the club's 20th consecutive season in the Chinese Super League since the league's founding in the 2004. It was the team's 33nd consecutive season in the top flight of Chinese football. It covered a period from 1 January 2023 to 31 December 2023.

Summary

Pre-season
With the 2-year renovation at the team's traditional home Workers' Stadium completed at the end of 2022, reports early in 2023 confirmed that Guoan will return to the 68,000-seat refurbished stadium in the new season. 

On 11 January, media reports confirmed that Zhang Yuning, the team's top goalscorer last season, would stay with the team in 2023 despite rumors of him transferring to play for European clubs. On 14 January, Saudi Pro League's Al Nassr announced that it had signed Samir Memešević, confirming that his loan to Guoan had ended and will not be renewed.

On 14 January, long-time Beijing-based reporter Qi Le published an online article that recounted Guoan's difficulty in paying players' and staff's wages, and the team's resulting FIFA player registration ban, over the past years. According to the article, Guoan still owed wages to former players and staff including Fernando, Jonathan Viera, Renato Augusto, and Slaven Bilić and his coaching staff. Additionally, Guoan still owed Famalicão fees related to the transfer of Anderson Silva. The team, however, have made some progress in terms of paying back outstanding salaries, and Qi expected the team to be on healthier financial grounds with the league returning to normal and China relaxing its COVID-19 policies. Qi's reporting also confirmed that the team has extended its contract with veteran players Wang Gang and Zou Dehai. However, later reports in March confirms that Guoan has resolved all the outstanding wages and international transfer disputes, allowing for the club to be registered for the 2023 Super League season and register player transfers without issues. The Chinese FA officially confirmed on 13 March that Guoan has cleared itself of unpaid historical debt and wages. 

On 1 February, Norwegian club Ranheim announced the signing of Hou Yongyong, confirming that he has left the team after his contract ended at the conclusion of 2022.

Early in February, the Sport & Leisure channel for the local Beijing Radio and Television Station ran a special TV feature titled "Farewell Season." In it, BRTV reporters confirmed that veteran players Yu Yang, Jin Pengxiang, Jin Taiyan, Liu Huan and youngster Liu Guobo have left the team after their contracts with the club expired at the end of the 2022 season. Additional reports claim that while Li Ke's contract with the club expired at the end of 2022, he has continued his rehabilitation and returned to the team during pre-season with the hope of earning a new contract via participating in team training.

The team regrouped on 6 February and traveled to Hainan on 8 February to begin the winter training camp ahead of the new season. Top goalscorer from last season Zhang Yuning did not join the team as he was still recovering from a shoulder surgery, but Samuel Adegbenro traveled with the team.

On 13 February, Guoan announced that Croatian striker Marko Dabro have been loaned out to Latvian club Riga for the 2023 season.

On 25 February, the team played its first friendly against Changchun Yatai in Hainan. Guoan played with a mixture of first team and youth team players, and won 3–0 thanks to goals from Piao Cheng, Jiang Wenhao and Samuel Adegbenro.

On 26 February, reports emerged that Guoan had signed winger Yang Liyu from Guangzhou and former player Li Lei, who left Guoan for Swiss club Grasshopper, was set to return ahead of the new season. Guoan has also signed a new contract with Li Ke after deeming him physically fit to play for the club during winter training camp. 

On 1 March, Guoan played its second training match of the pre-season against Dalian Pro. Guoan emerged victorious with goals from Kang Sang-woo, Xu Dongdong and Yan Yu, and a double by Cao Yongjing. Guoan won 5–1 at the final whistle and the team went on a small break. The team returned to training on 7 March in Hainan and will remain there until 23 March. New signings Li Lei, Yang Liyu and Josef de Souza are expected to join the team during training camp soon. 7 March also saw Croatian media confirm Macedonian midfielder Arijan Ademi's impending transfer to Guoan from Croatian team Dinamo Zagreb. For a transfer fee of €1 million, he is reported to have signed a 3-year contract with the team earning €1.65 million per season. Additional reports confirmed Guoan's signing of right-back Feng Boxuan from Henan Songshan Longmen as he joined team training on 7 March as well.

Guoan played another training match on 11 March against Tianjin Jinmen Tigers. Guoan lost the game 1–2 as Tianjin feature 4 foreign players and none of Guoan's new signings took part in the game. Jian Wenhao, playing at left back, scored Guoan's only goal. 6 days later on 17 March, Guoan played a training match against CMCL team Shanghai Mitsubishi Heavy Industries Flying Lion. New singing Feng Boxuan, Li Lei, and Yang Liyu featured in the game. Thanks to goals from Tian Yuda, Li Boxi and Yang Liyu, Guoan emerged victorious 3–0.

Players

Transfers

In

Out

Friendlies

Competitions

Overview

Chinese Super League

Results summary

Results by round

League table

Notes

References

2023
Chinese football clubs 2023 season